thumb|right|Down stopping train in 1958
Poole railway station is on the South West Main Line serving the town of Poole in Dorset, England. It is situated in the town centre next to Holes Bay.

The station is operated by South Western Railway and is served by London to Weymouth express and semi-fast services. It is also the terminus for the London to Poole stopping service. Virgin CrossCountry used to operate services from Poole to the North West and Scotland but since 2007 these now start/terminate at Bournemouth.

History
The first Poole station was on the western side of Holes Bay, at the location that ultimately became Hamworthy Goods. There was a branch to the west of Holes Bay from Poole Junction (now Hamworthy) to the station called Poole, situated to the west of the bridge over the inlet. This was the "Poole" station that Somerset & Dorset trains originally reached over L&SWR tracks, after reversing at Wimborne.

This was inconvenient for the town of Poole, and the L&SWR interest built a railway to reach Poole itself from a new junction at what is now Broadstone, opening on 2 December 1872.

The new station was called New Poole, and the junction station at what is now Broadstone was called New Poole Junction. When this caused confusion, the New Poole Junction station was renamed Broadstone, naming it after the nearby Broadstone Farm.

The original New Poole station buildings were built on the London-bound platform, close to the site of Towngate Bridge which replaced a level crossing in 1971. Following the opening of the Bournemouth Direct Railway line via Sway in 1888, the platforms' direction of travel was reversed. The Victorian buildings were replaced by a British Rail prefabricated structure on the other side of the line in the 1970s. This was replaced by the current station building built in the late 1980s. In 2004 proposals were drawn up for the current station buildings and footbridge to be replaced as part of redevelopment plans for the old goods yard. A hotel was to be built on the site of the current station building, however as of 2010 these plans have not progressed.

Until 1967, trains through Poole were normally steam hauled. Between 1967 and 1988, passenger services on the London Waterloo-Weymouth line were normally provided by Class 33/1 diesel locomotives with Class 438 coaching stock (also known as 4-TC units). The line through Poole was electrified in 1988, using the standard British Rail Southern Region direct current third rail at 750 volts. Class 442 electric multiple units were initially used following electrification, until being displaced by new Class 444 electric multiple units in 2007. Nowadays, a mix of Class 444 and Class 450 units are in use.

Description

The station has two platforms capable of handling trains of 12 coaches, platform 1 is bi-directional. Trains from London terminating at the station regularly use platform 1 before moving to the empty stock sidings further west and reversing for the return service. There was a goods line to Poole Quay which joined the main line at the Hamworthy end of the station. It ran along part of what is now the Holes Bay relief road and West Quay Road. It closed in May 1960 and was removed in 1961.

The Engineers line reference code for the line is BML2.

Under the station name signs on the platforms are additional boards informing passengers that Poole is the home of Bournemouth University, the main campus of which is located in the Talbot Village area of the borough. The signs replaced most of the ones displaying the Condor Ferries logo with information on alighting at the station for services to the Channel Islands, though some remain on the station building. The Condor signs, the original version of which were installed in 1997, were in place due to the Condor Ferries Rail/Sea through ticketing scheme which includes a taxi to the Harbour ferry port from Poole station.

There is no passenger service along the railway line linking Poole station with Poole Harbour ferry terminal; however, it is only a 15-minute walk and there is a regular bus service provided by Wilts & Dorset (t/a Morebus) to a stop close to the port (Routes 8/9).

Facilities include:
Ticket office (staffed seven days per week)
Quick Ticket machines (self-service)
News agent
Photo booth
Luggage trolleys
Toilets
Bicycle storage
Taxi rank
Bus stop
Car park

Train running information is provided via digital information displays, timetable poster boards, customer help points and automated announcements. Step-free access is available to both platforms via a ramped underpass.

Services

The station is served by South Western Railway.

The typical off-peak stopping pattern of this station, as of June 2021, is below:
 2 trains per hour on Monday-Friday, 1 on Poole-London Waterloo express service, and 1 on Weymouth-London Waterloo semi-fast service.
 3 trains per hour on Saturday, 1 on Weymouth-London Waterloo express service, 1 on Weymouth-London Waterloo semi-fast service calling at all stations west of Poole, and 1 on Poole-Winchester stopping service.
 2 trains per hour on Sunday, 1 on Weymouth-London Waterloo express service, 1 on Poole-London Waterloo stopping service.

Notes

References

External links

Railway stations in Poole
Railway stations in Great Britain opened in 1872
Former London and South Western Railway stations
Railway stations served by South Western Railway
Railway stations serving harbours and ports in the United Kingdom
DfT Category C1 stations